La Toya Woods (born 1985) is the winner of the Miss Trinidad & Tobago Universe 2010 pageant and was a contestant in the Miss Universe 2010 pageant in Las Vegas, USA. She competed in the local pageant as Miss Point Lisas.

Woods was at the time of the Miss Universe contest a Psychology student at the College of Science, Technology and Applied Arts of Trinidad & Tobago (COSTAATT). She is also a fashion model, her work including modelling during Trinidad and Tobago Fashion Week, for local fashion shows, and Caribbean Belle magazine.

In 2011 she was a judge at the Red Bull Flugtag at William's Bay, Chaguaramas.

References 

1985 births
Living people
Trinidad and Tobago beauty pageant winners
Trinidad and Tobago female models
Miss Universe 2010 contestants